Viktor Maier (tr. Viktor Mayer; born 16 May 1990) is a Kyrgyzstani-German footballer who plays as a winger for FC Eintracht Rheine. He made 21 appearances for the Kyrgyzstan national team scoring once.

Early life
Maier was born in Kant, Kirghiz SSR, Soviet Union, but emigrated with his parents to Osnabrück, Germany, when he was just ten months old.

Career
Maier was called up in May 2015 by Aleksandr Krestinin to represent Kyrgyzstan national team in the 2018 FIFA World Cup Qualifiers against Bangladesh and Australia. He made his debut in a 3–1 victory against Bangladesh, playing the full match.

Career statistics

Scores and results list Kyrgyzstan's goal tally first, score column indicates score after each Maier goal.

References

External links
 
 
 
 

1990 births
Living people
People from Chüy Region
Association football midfielders
German footballers
Kyrgyzstani footballers
Kyrgyzstan international footballers
Germany youth international footballers
German people of Kyrgyzstani descent
Kyrgyzstani people of German descent
Citizens of Germany through descent
Soviet emigrants to Germany
Eerste Divisie players
Regionalliga players
Hamburger SV II players
Sportfreunde Lotte players
VfL Osnabrück II players
Alemannia Aachen players
TSV Havelse players
SV Meppen players
FC Emmen players
SC Wiedenbrück 2000 players
Kyrgyzstani expatriate footballers
German expatriate footballers
German expatriate sportspeople in the Netherlands
Expatriate footballers in the Netherlands
FC Eintracht Rheine players